The Irène Joliot-Curie Prize is a French prize for women in science and technology, founded in 2001. It is awarded by the Ministry of Higher Education, Research and Innovation, the Airbus Group corporate foundation, the French Academy of Sciences and the Academy of Technologies, it aims at rewarding women for their work in the fields of science and technology".

The prize is named after French scientist Irène Joliot-Curie, a French chemist, physicist and politician who won the Nobel Prize in Chemistry in 1935 for the discovery of artificial radioactivity. (This prize should be distinguished from a different prize with the same name, offered since 1956 by the Société Française de Physique. which rewards work in the field of physics each year.)

Each year three awards are given: one for the female scientist of the year, a second to a young female scientist, and a third to a woman in business and technology. In addition, until 2009, of the award a fourth category of awards was given, to an individual or group in recognition of their mentorship of women in science.

Since 2011, the award winners have been chosen by the French Academy of Sciences and the French Academy of Technologies.

Winners
The winners have included:

References

French science and technology awards
Women in science and technology
Awards established in 2001
2001 establishments in France
Science awards honoring women